The Mariamman temple (Tamil: மாரியம்மன் கோவில்) is located near the market in Ooty, in the state of Tamil Nadu, India. Mariamman is the local deity of the region. It is dedicated to Mariamman, the Hindu Goddess of rain.

Legend
An incident is narrated related with the formation of this temple. According to it every Tuesday merchants from Coimabatore came to this region to trade with the local tribals. On one of this day two sisters travelling from north reached market. They had divine look and manner. When they asked for a place to stay, they were told to stay under a nearby tree. They did not know that the sisters were Goddesses. A lightning or flash of light appeared near the tree and the sisters disappeared. Then the people understood that the sisters were divine forms and built a temple for Goddess Kaliamman and Mariamman together. It is the Mariamman temple seen today. It is the only place where both goddess are seen together. Even today people gather at market on Tuesday and worship Goddess Mariamman on their way returning from market.

Temple Festival 
Ooty Mariamman Temple Festival is celebrated in the month of April. Mariamman, the mother Goddess is widely considered to be a form of the goddess Kali. Mariamman is also referred to as Seethala Gowri or Mahamaayi. A festival honouring the goddess is held in the temple annually, which is visited by thousands of devotees from across the country. One of the important events in the festival includes devotees walking barefoot over burning coal to show their devotion to the goddess. The devotees also make oil lamps from grounded rice and offer them to the goddess.

See also
 Ooty Lake
 Stone House, Ooty
 Ooty Golf Course
 St. Stephen's Church, Ooty

References 

Culture of Ooty
Hindu temples in Nilgiris district
Buildings and structures in Ooty
Tourist attractions in Ooty